Ingris Marisela Castellón, known as Marisela Castellón, is a Honduran footballer. She has been a member of the Honduras women's national team.

International career
Castellón capped for Honduras at senior level during the 2014 CONCACAF Women's Championship qualification.

International goals
Scores and results list Honduras' goal tally first

Personal life
Castellón has moved to New Orleans, United States.

References

Living people
Honduran women's footballers
Honduras women's international footballers
Year of birth missing (living people)
Women's association footballers not categorized by position